The Guantanamo Bay Hunger Strikes were a series of prisoner protests at the Guantanamo Bay detention camp. The first hunger strikes began in 2002 when the camp first opened, but the secrecy of the camp's operations prevented news of those strikes from reaching the public. The first widely reported hunger strikes occurred in 2005.

2005 Hunger Strikes 
In July 2005, detainees held by the United States at the Guantanamo Bay detention camp initiated two hunger strikes to protest their innocence and the conditions of their confinement, with 46 prisoners making the decision to refuse meals on Dec. 25, according to the US military, bringing the total number of participants in the hunger strike to 84.<ref name="BostonGlobe2005-12-30JoinHungerStrikers">
{{cite news
 |url         = http://www.boston.com/news/nation/washington/articles/2005/12/30/46_guantanamo_detainees_join_hunger_strike/
 |publisher   = Boston Globe
 |date        = 2005-12-30
 |title       = 46 Guantanamo detainees join hunger strike: US says increase since Christmas brings total to 84
 |quote       = The US military said yesterday that a long-running hunger strike among detainees at the Guantanamo Bay prison underwent a very significant increase" starting on Christmas Day, more than doubling the number of prisoners who are protesting their indefinite detention without trial by refusing to eat.
 |access-date  = 2010-01-21
 |author      = Charlie Savage
 |url-status     = dead
 |archive-url  = https://web.archive.org/web/20100314210209/http://www.boston.com/news/nation/washington/articles/2005/12/30/46_guantanamo_detainees_join_hunger_strike/
 |archive-date = 2010-03-14
}} 
</ref>

32 of the longer-term strikers had been hospitalized as of December, which camp authorities responded by nasally force-feeding captives, according to the camp's Standard Operating Procedures. The prisoners spent 26 days without food.

In September 2005, the New York Times reported that as many as 200 prisoners, a third of the camp, had taken to hunger striking, and that at least 20 of them were being force-fed through nasal tubes and given fluids intravenously. Major Weir, a spokesman at the base, said "We will not let them starve themselves to the point of causing harm to themselves."
In the April 14, 2008 edition of the New Yorker magazine, Jeffrey Toobin reported that there were about ten hunger strikers at Guantanamo. The overall population had declined markedly, as many detainees had been repatriated or transferred to detention in other countries.

As a result of the hunger strikes, the weight of at least eighty captives dropped to below  each, as reported by Andy Worthington, the author of The Guantanamo Files. Human rights workers and physicians' professional associations have criticized the use of force-feeding on mentally competent patients at Guantanamo.

 2013 Hunger Strikes 
A new wave of the hunger strike arose in early 2013. At its peak in July, 106 out of the 166 detainees were considered to be on hunger strike, with 45 of them being force-fed by the prison administration.

On December 4, 2013, the US military announced that it would no longer disclose information about the hunger strikes, explaining that "The release of this information serves no operational purpose."

The last disclosed figures in December showed the number of hunger strikers had risen to 15, all of whom were force-fed.

Dhiab litigation
In 2013, hunger striker Jihad Ahmed Mustafa Dhiab sought an injunction in the United States District Court for the District of Columbia to stop the government from force-feeding him.  In October 2014, District Judge Gladys Kessler determined that she had no jurisdiction over confinement conditions at Guantanamo. After the United States Court of Appeals for the District of Columbia Circuit rejected that theory, Dhabi again sought an injunction to stop the force feedings.  In November 2014, District Judge Kessler again denied Dhabi relief.

However, in the course of  discovery, the government disclosed that it had recorded its force-feedings of Dhabi and classified the videotapes as "SECRET."  Sixteen news organizations intervened, seeking access to the tapes. In October 2014, District Judge Kessler ordered to unseal the 28 tapes.

The D.C. Circuit, in an unsigned opinion joined by Chief Circuit Judge Merrick Garland, determined it did not yet have jurisdiction over the interlocutory order but encouraged the district court to consider additional declarations made by the government. In December 2015, District Judge Kessler again ordered the tapes to be redacted and unsealed.

In March 2017, the D.C. Circuit ordered that the tapes remain secret, with the panel unanimously voting to reverse but with each of the three judges providing different reasons in separate opinions. Senior Judge A. Raymond Randolph argued that the press has no right to access classified court filings made by prisoners petitioning for habeas corpus and that the lower court clearly erred by not deferring to declarations by Rear Admirals Kyle Cozad and Richard W. Butler asserting a national security threat.  Judge Judith W. Rogers argued that the First Amendment to the United States Constitution provides the public a qualified right to access prisoners' court filings but agreed that the government had identified a national security interest justifying secrecy.  Senior Judge Stephen F. Williams also agreed that national security justified secrecy but questioned if the government could logically keep all Guantanamo filings secret.

References

External links

Carol Rosenberg, "Ramadan at Guantanamo Bay includes nightly force-feedings", Miami Herald'', 24 August 2010
Alex Stonehill, "Mos Def Force-Fed in Solidarity with Guantanamo Hunger Strikers", The Seattle Globalist, 9 July 2013

Guantanamo Bay detention camp
Hunger strikes
Protests in the United States